Gonionota euthyrsa is a moth in the family Depressariidae. It was described by Edward Meyrick in 1930. It is found in Ecuador.

Description 
The moth's wingspan is 21–22 mm. The forewings are reddish-purple fuscous, on the basal two-fifths speckled whitish, towards the base sprinkled dark fuscous. There is some irregular ferruginous-ochreous suffusion towards the costa beyond the middle, and before the apex, as well as a minute white dot on the lower angle of the cell. The hindwings are rather dark grey.

References

Moths described in 1930
Gonionota